(The Trickster Tricked) is a one-act opéra comique by Pierre Gaveaux, to a libretto by François Bernard-Valville. It premiered at the Théâtre Feydeau on 2 August 1800 (The first-edition libretto gives the date as 14 Thermidor  VIII, using the French Republican Calendar created during the French Revolution).

Roles

Synopsis
The play opens in the study of Jocard, a prosecuting attorney. Duval, his clerk, is working at his desk, musing over the circumstances that brought him to this role: He is really a midshipman, but has taken on the role of clerk due to his love for Agathe, Jocard's pupil. ("") Jocard's wife has recently died, and Jocard is now taking an interest in Agathe himself. She cannot be forced to marry him, but should Jocard find out about Duval's scheme, trouble would arise. Agathe thinks she should leave, but she and Duval promise to be faithful to each other. ("")

Jocard is heard approaching as they finish their farewells, and Agathe fails to escape in time. He asks why she was there, she tells him she was looking for him – which gives Jocard quite the wrong idea. Quickly refocusing, she says she came to tell him about some business with a proprietor of a hotel. Jocard knows of it, and she quickly loses his interest. However, all is not well: Jocard, pleased with Duval's work hitherto, sends him off to handle a case... for his uncle, who is not aware of Duval's impersonation. The scene ends with Duval, shaken, asking Agathe if it is necessary for him to return, only for Jocard to overhear him, and, misconstruing him, cheerily tell him that yes, he will be needed afterwards.

[...]

List of arias

 (A most innocent lie) – Duval
 (It is necessary that I leave) – Agathe and Duval
 (These beautiful gallants, these young people) – Jocard
 (You who suffer the evil of love) – Agathe
 (Let us drink, drink with our beloved ones) – Jocard and Beaupré
 (God of happiness, God full of charm) – Agathe
 (I wait, impatiently) – Agathe
 (Come into my arms, Oh! Come, my beloved!) – Simonin, Agathe and Jocard
Finale:  (Come, Mr. Make-believe) – Simonin, Jocard, the notary, Beaupré, Agathe and Duval

References
Notes

Sources
François Bernard-Valville and Pierre Gaveaux, (An VIII),  – libretto, Huet et Charon, Paris. Accessed 11 September 2008.

External links
 Full score at the Internet Archive

Operas by Pierre Gaveaux
French-language operas
Operas
Opéras comiques
1800 operas
One-act operas